George Edward Humphry (1816 – 25 January 1867) was an English cricketer.

Humphry made his first-class debut for Hampshire in 1845 Petworth Cricket Club. Humphry played four further first-class matches from 1845 to 1850, with his final first-class match coming against an All-England Eleven. He died at Southampton, Hampshire.

Humphry's brother, William, played first-class cricket for Sussex.

External links
George Humphry at Cricinfo
George Humphry at CricketArchive

1816 births
1867 deaths
English cricketers
Hampshire cricketers